Kailia is a genus of trilobites in the order Phacopida (family Encrinuridae) that existed during the lower Silurian in what is now China. It was described by W. Zhang in 1974, and the type species is Kailia quadrisulcata. The type locality was the Xiushan Formation in Sichuan.

References

External links
 Kailia at the Paleobiology Database

Encrinuridae genera
Fossil taxa described in 1974
Silurian trilobites
Prehistoric animals of China
Paleozoic life of Nunavut